The following highways are numbered 1X:

Canada
 Alberta Highway 1X

United States
 New York State Route 1X (former)